Parliamentary elections were held in Uruguay on 29 November 1925. Although the National Party won the most seats as a single party, the  various factions of the Colorado Party took over half the seats in the Chamber of Deputies.

Results

References

Elections in Uruguay
Uruguay
Parliamentary
Uruguay
Election and referendum articles with incomplete results